No. 24 Squadron (also known as No. XXIV Squadron) of the Royal Air Force is the Air Mobility Operational Conversion Unit (AMOCU). Based at RAF Brize Norton in Oxfordshire, 24 Squadron is responsible for aircrew training on C-130J Hercules, A400M Atlas and C17 Globemaster. The squadron also delivers engineer training for these aircraft.

History

Fighter squadron (1915–1919)
The squadron was founded as No. 24 Squadron, Royal Flying Corps on 1 September 1915 at Hounslow Heath Aerodrome. It arrived in France equipped with D.H.2 fighters in February 1916. The DH.2 came with a reputation for spinning because it had a rotary engine "pushing" it, but after Officer Commanding Major Lanoe Hawker demonstrated the recently discovered procedures for pulling out of a spin, the squadron's pilots came to appreciate the type's manoeuvrability.

By early 1917 the DH.2 was outclassed and they were replaced by the Airco DH.5. The DH.5 did not prove suitable as a fighter but the squadron used it in a ground-attack role. One of the first actions was during the Battle of Messines, and they took part later in the Battle of Cambrai. The DH.5 was phased out of operations and the squadron were given the SE.5a in December 1917. After a few months in the ground-attack role the squadron returned to air combat operations. By October 1918 the squadron had destroyed 200 enemy aircraft. With the armistice the squadron returned to England and was disbanded in February 1919.

As a VIP transport squadron (1920–1968)

On 1 February 1920 the squadron was re-formed at RAF Kenley as a communications and training squadron. During the General Strike of 1926, because of the lack of a postal services, the squadron was used to deliver government dispatches around the country.

Following the outbreak of the Second World War the squadron acquired civil airliners which were impressed for wartime service. It provided a detachment in France to run courier services, but with the withdrawal of British troops it was soon used to evacuate men back to England. Former British Airways and Imperial Airways aircraft were put to use on a network of communications flights including trips to Gibraltar and later Malta.

The squadron had grown into a large organisation, with a network of routes around the United Kingdom and eventually extended to India. It also operated VIP transports including Sir Winston Churchill's personal aircraft. It was decided to break the squadron up: the internal communication flight became 510 Squadron in October 1942. In June 1943 a second squadron, No. 512, equipped with Douglas Dakotas was split off from No 24. This left 24 Squadron to concentrate on the long distance routes using the Avro York.

After many years the squadron had to leave RAF Hendon in February 1946 as the airfield was now too small to operate the larger Avro Yorks and Avro Lancastrians. The squadron was also designated a Commonwealth squadron with crews from various Commonwealth countries joining the squadron strength.

As a Transport Command Squadron (1968–2013)
In 1968 the squadron moved from RAF Colerne to RAF Lyneham and re-equipped with the Lockheed Hercules. The squadron re-equipped with the new generation Hercules C.4 and C.5 (RAF designations for the C-130J-30 and C-130J respectively) in 2002. It celebrated 40 years of Hercules operation in 2008 and remained at Lyneham until 2011 when the squadron relocated to RAF Brize Norton.

As a Training Squadron (2013–present) 
In 2013, 24 Squadron started its transition from a front-line C130J Hercules Squadron to become the Air Mobility Operational Conversion Unit. This transition brigaded the majority of flying and engineer training within the Air Mobility Force under one specialist training unit. 24 Squadron is currently responsible for the provision of training to aircrews flying the C130J Hercules and A400M Atlas aircraft; in addition 24 Squadron's Maintenance Training School is responsible for training engineers to maintain the C130J Hercules, A400M Atlas and C17 Globemaster aircraft. As a Central Flying School accredited training establishment, 24 Squadron is the professional training body for the Air Mobility Force delivering flying training for the C130J Hercules, A400M Atlas and C17 Globemaster as well as engineering training for the C130J Hercules, A400M Atlas and C17 Globemaster. The Squadron also oversees Aircrew Instructor Development for the Air Mobility Force, delivering initial aircrew instructor courses.

Aircraft operated

 1915-1915 Curtiss JN-4
 1915-1915 Caudron G.III
 1915-1915 Avro 504
 1915-1915 Royal Aircraft Factory BE.2C
 1915-1915 Bleriot IX
 1915-1915 Bristol Scout
 1915-1915 Maurice Farman Longhorn
 1915-1915 Maurice Farman Shorthorn
 1915–1916 Vickers FB.5
 1916–1917 Airco DH.2
 1917–1918 Airco DH.5
 1917–1919 Royal Aircraft Factory SE.5A
 1920–1930 Bristol F.2 Fighter
 1920–1927 de Havilland DH.9A
 1927–1933 Avro 504N
 1927–1933 de Havilland Moth
 1927–1933 Westland Wapiti
 1927–1933 Fairey IIIF
 1930–1933 Hawker Tomtit
 1931–1932 Avro Tutor
 1933–1941 Hawker Hart
 1933–1938 de Havilland Tiger Moth
 1933–1938 Hawker Audax
 1933–1944 de Havilland Dragon Rapide and Dominie
 1937–1938 Miles Nighthawk
 1937–1943 de Havilland Express
 1938–1940 Miles Magister
 1938-1938 Avro Anson I
 1938–1944 Miles Mentor
 1938–1942 Percival Vega Gull
 1939–1940 de Havilland Leopard Moth
 1939–1940 de Havilland Fox Moth
 1939–1941 de Havilland Dragon
 1939–1942 Lockheed 10 Electra
 1939–1942 Percival Q.6
 1939–1940 de Havilland Puss Moth
 1939–1944 de Havilland Flamingo
 1939–1940 Airspeed Envoy
 1940–1942 Miles Whitney Straight
 1940-1940 Heston Phoenix
 1940-1940 Savoia-Marchetti S.73
 1940-1940 Douglas DC-3
 1940-1940 Avro Anson I
 1940-1940 Armstrong Whitworth Ensign
 1940–1942 de Havilland Hornet Moth
 1940–1944 Airspeed Oxford
 1941–1943 Stinson Reliant
 1941–1942 General Aircraft Cygnet
 1941–1942 Blackburn Botha
 1941–1945 Beech 17 Traveler
 1941-1941 Parnall Heck III
 1941–1942 de Havilland Leopard Moth
 1941–1943 Lockheed Hudson I
 1941–1942 Lockheed Hudson II
 1942-1942 Messerschmitt Bf 108 Aldon
 1942–1943 Fokker F.XXII
 1942–1943 Foster Wikner Wicko
 1942-1942 Lockheed Hudson IV
 1942–1945 Lockheed Hudson III
 1942-1942 Heston Phoenix
 1942–1943 Lockheed Hudson VI
 1942–1944 Lockheed 12
 1942–1943 Percival Proctor
 1943–1944 Grumman Goose
 1943–1944 Vickers Wellington XVI
 1943–1944 Avro York I
 1943–1952 Douglas Dakota
 1944-1944 Avro Anson XX
 1944–1945 Douglas Skymaster
 1946–1949 Avro Lancastrian C2
 1946–1951 Avro York C1
 1950-1950 Vickers Valetta C1
 1950-1950 Handley Page Hastings C1
 1951–1968 Handley Page Hastings C2
 1951–1968 Handley Page Hastings C4
 1968–2000 Lockheed Hercules C130K
 2000–present Lockheed Hercules C130J
 2013-present Airbus A400M Atlas

Commanding officers
The following officers have held command of No. 24 Squadron:

 1 September 1915, Captain A G Moore
 29 September 1915, Major L G Hawker
 29 November 1916, Major C E Rabagliati
 23 March 1917, Major A G Moore
 22 August 1917, Major J G Swart
 2 February 1918, Major V A H Robeson
 1 April 1920, Squadron Leader E H Johnston
 23 October 1922, Squadron Leader O T Boyd
 22 October 1923, Squadron Leader R S Maxwell
 27 August 1925, Squadron Leader W H L O'Neill
 20 September 1927, Squadron Leader S N Cole
 20 March 1929, Squadron Leader D S Don
 3 October 1931, Squadron Leader J Whitford
 1 December 1935, Squadron Leader H K Goode
 June 1939, Wing Commander J Anderson
 October 1939, Wing Commander H K Goode
 April 1941, Wing Commander H G Lee
 June 1941, Wing Commander P M W Wright
 June 1942, Wing Commander H B Collins
 September 1944, Wing Commander T H Archbell
 October 1945, Wing Commander E L A Walter
 September 1946, Wing Commander C W K Nicholls
 March 1948, Wing Commander P H Lombard
 March 1950, Wing Commander C F Read (RAAF)
 December 1950, Squadron Leader H A Nash
 October 1951, Major J N Robbs (SAAF)
 October 1953, Squadron Leader J L Kerr
 September 1955, Squadron Leader R B Bolt (RNZAF)
 February 1957, Squadron Leader M M Mair
 October 1957, Wing Commander D W Hitchins (RAAF)
 October 1959, Wing Commander H D Archer
 November 1961, Wing Commander R B Sillars
 November 1963, Wing Commander R T Saunders
 January 1966, Wing Commander G Moss
 January 1968, Wing Commander J E H Tetley
 July 1970, Wing Commander R D Bates
 July 1972, Wing Commander M J Hardy
 July 1974, Wing Commander C E Evans
 February 1976, Wing Commander M C A Davis
 August 1978, Wing Commander K Chapman
 October 1980, Wing Commander D R Jones
 March 1983, Wing Commander C J M Carrington
 June 1985, Wing Commander R M Peach
 December 1987, Wing Commander D B Farquhar
 April 1990, Wing Commander R D Iredale
 October 1992, Wing Commander M D Stringer
 June 1995, Wing Commander R M Bailey
 April 1998, Wing Commander P N Oborn CBE
 August 2000, Squadron Leader G C Cook
 December 2000, Wing Commander R Hobson
 June 2003, Wing Commander K Groves
 October 2005, Squadron Leader S K Marston
 December 2005, Wing Commander D Turnbull
 June 2008, Wing Commander A Bacon
 November 2010 Wing Commander P G Cochrane
 February 2011 Wing Commander T Jones
 December 2012 Wing Commander D James
 January 2015 Wing Commander D Rawlins
 March 2017 Wing Commander G Burdett
 October 2019 Wing Commander A McIntyre

See also
 List of RAF squadrons
  No. 24 Squadron PAF

References

Citations

Bibliography
 The Illustrated Encyclopedia of Aircraft (Part Work 1982–1985), Orbis Publishing.
 Jefford, G. G.  RAF Squadrons, second edition 2001, Airlife Publishing, UK, .

 Rawlings, J. D. R. "History of No. 24 Squadron". Air Pictorial, April 1972, Vol.34 No.4. pp. 144–147.

External links

 No.24 Squadron RAF

024
Military units and formations established in 1915
024 Squadron
Transport aircraft squadrons of the Royal Air Force
1915 establishments in England